Nityanandapur Union is a union parishad situated at Shailkupa Upazila,  in Jhenaidah District, Khulna Division of Bangladesh. There are 25 villages and 19 Mouzas in the union.

References

External links
 

Unions of Khulna Division
Unions of Shailkupa Upazila
Unions of Jhenaidah District